Katarzyna Żakowicz (born 12 February 1975 in Mońki) is a retired Polish athlete who specialised in the shot put. She represented her country at the 2000 Summer Olympics, but failed to qualify for the final.

She has personal bests of 19.28 metres outdoors (2000) and 18.59 metres indoors (2001).

Competition record

References

1975 births
Living people
Polish female shot putters
Athletes (track and field) at the 2000 Summer Olympics
Olympic athletes of Poland
Sportspeople from Mońki
Universiade medalists in athletics (track and field)
Podlasie Białystok athletes
Universiade bronze medalists for Poland
Medalists at the 2001 Summer Universiade